Penrose is a neighborhood of St. Louis, Missouri. The Penrose neighborhood is split with half of it in the city's 21st Ward and the other half in the city's 1st Ward. The neighborhood is located on the north side of the city just south of Interstate 70 and west of O’Fallon Park. It is bounded by Florissant Avenue and I-70 on the north, Natural Bridge on the south, North Newstead and Pope Avenue on the east, and Kingshighway Boulevard on the west.

Penrose is represented by Alderwoman Sharon Tyus in the 1st Ward, and Alderman John Collins-Muhammad in the 21st Ward.

Demographics

In 2020 Penrose's racial makeup was 95.3% Black, 0.9% White, 0.5% Native American, 2.8% Two or More Races, and 0.5% Some Other Race. 0.8% of the people were of Hispanic or Latino origin.

References

Neighborhoods in St. Louis